SMS Mars may refer to one of two ships in the German and Austro-Hungarian Navies:

 , a German gunnery training ship in the 19th century
 , an Austro-Hungarian central battery ship, renamed Mars in 1912